BCKDH may refer to:
 (3-methyl-2-oxobutanoate dehydrogenase (2-methylpropanoyl-transferring))-phosphatase, an enzyme
 3-methyl-2-oxobutanoate dehydrogenase, an enzyme